Word Up or Word Up! may refer to:

Word Up! (album), a 1986 album by Cameo
"Word Up!" (song), its title song, which has also been covered by several artists
Word Up! Greatest Hits – Live, 2007 live album by Cameo
Word Up! (magazine), a teen magazine marketed to African Americans
Word Up (video game) (also known as Word Soup), a computer pub game popular in the UK
 "Word Up", a 1982 single by Legacy
 WordUp (program), a word processor for the Atari ST